The Physics of Basketball is a non-fiction book by John Fontanella first published on November 15, 2006 that explores the scientific side of basketball. It is written from the perspective of a fan of the game and then through the eyes of a physicist.

John Fontanella has been a physics professor at the United States Naval Academy since 1971 and was a college basketball player for Westminster College in New Wilmington, PA. As a senior in 1967, he was a NAIA First Team All-American. He then earned an NCAA postgraduate scholarship to Case Western Reserve where he earned his Ph.D. in Physics. He is currently focusing his research on naval applications of dielectrics.

External links
Johns Hopkins' Book Site
John Fontanella's site

Popular physics books
Basketball mass media
2006 non-fiction books